TVP3 Katowice a.k.a. TV Katowice also Television Katowice is one of the regional branches of the TVP, Poland's public television broadcaster. It serves the entire Silesian Voivodeship with particular dedication to the Upper Silesian Metropolis and greater Silesian metropolitan area.

Languages 
Generally, broadcasts are conducted in Polish. Some broadcasts are conducted in the Silesian language (example U nos w Bytkowie, Patefon ujka Ericha, Holy War) and some in German (example Schlesien Journal).

Broadcast area 
Broadcast area: generally Upper Silesia - mainly Silesian Voivodeship and Opole Voivodeship, furthermore small part (about 1/4) of Lesser Poland Voivodeship, very small part of Łódź Voivodeship and Świętokrzyskie Voivodeship in Poland, and also very small part of Moravian-Silesian Region in Czech Republic and very small part of Slovakia (north-western part of Žilina Region).

Terrestrial transmitters and editorial offices
The TV center is located in Katowice, Television street no 1 in main part of Upper-Silesian Metropolis. The main tower has a height of 90 meters. The secondary transmitter lies in Kosztowy - district of Mysłowice (suburb of Katowice), which has a height of 355 meters (the second tallest radio mast in Poland). Beyond this the signal is repeated by six more  transmitters. Local redaction section (editorial offices) are found in Rybnik, Bielsko-Biała and Częstochowa.

Logo history

References

External links 
Website

Telewizja Polska
Television channels and stations established in 1957
Mass media in Katowice